Elena Bovina was the defending champion, but did not compete this year due to a right shoulder injury.

Lindsay Davenport won the title, defeating Amélie Mauresmo 6–4, 6–4 in the final.

Seeds
The first four seeds received a bye into the second round.

Draw

Finals

Top half

Bottom half

External links
 WTA tournament draws

Pilot Pen Tennis
2005 Pilot Pen Tennis